Final table of the 1998–1999 season of the French Championship of Rugby League.

Final table

Tonneins received a 5 points penalty

External links
 1998-1999 ranking
 Ranking on the newspaper Humanité

Rugby league competitions in France
French Championship season
French Championship season